Eurrhyparodes multilinea is a moth in the family Crambidae. It was described by George Thomas Bethune-Baker in 1906. It is found in New Guinea.

The wingspan is about 42 mm. The head, thorax and abdomen are sepia brown, the thorax and abdomen with a dark slaty-grey central stripe. Both wings are dark sepia brown, with all the veins palely outlined. The termen is pale slaty grey with a fine dark crenulate line.

References

Moths described in 1906
Spilomelinae